The Europe Netball World Cup Qualifiers were held in Scotland between 12 October and 16 October 2022. Six teams competed for two places at the 2023 Netball World Cup. (Another European team, England, had already qualified via their position in the world rankings and did not play in this tournament.)

The tournament was played in round-robin format.

Standings

Matches

References 

2022 in netball
Netball
Netball
Europe
International netball competitions hosted by Scotland
Netball